Abdul Aziz Bin Khalid Al-Ghanim Al Maadeed (1903 - 1998)  was a Qatari diplomat and the first chairman of the Consultative Assembly of Qatar. At the first meeting of the Consultative Assembly, he was selected as the Speaker of the council.

References 

1903 births
1998 deaths
Qatari politicians
Chairmen of Consultative Assembly of Qatar